Ratlam City Assembly constituency is one of the 230 constituencies of Madhya Pradesh Legislative Assembly. It is a segment of Ratlam Lok Sabha constituency, and lies in Ratlam District.

Members of Vidhan Sabha
As part of Madhya Bharat Legislative Assembly :

As part of Madhya Pradesh Legislative Assembly :

Election results

2013 Vidhan Sabha Elections
 Chetanya Kumar Kashyap (BJP) : 76,184 votes   
 Smt Adity Dawesar (Congress) : 35,879 
 Paras Dada (Ind.) : 14969

2008 Vidhan Sabha Elections
 Paras Dada (Ind.) : 62,364 votes
 Himmat Kothari (BJP) 
 Pramod Gugalia (Congress) :  4465

1962 Vidhan Sabha Elections
 Babulal Nathulal (Ind.) : 16,476 votes  
 Dr. Devi Singh Surajmal (INC) : 14704

See also
 Ratlam

References

Assembly constituencies of Madhya Pradesh